Vyazemsky District is the name of several administrative and municipal districts in Russia.
Vyazemsky District, Khabarovsk Krai, an administrative and municipal district of Khabarovsk Krai
Vyazemsky District, Smolensk Oblast, an administrative and municipal district of Smolensk Oblast

See also
Vyazemsky (disambiguation)

References